Lambertia fairallii, commonly known as Fairall's honeysuckle, is a shrub which is endemic to the south-west of Western Australia.

The species was formally described in 1983 by botanist Greg Keighery.

Description 
A description of L. fairallii is given in Florabase.

References

Eudicots of Western Australia
fairallii
Taxa named by Gregory John Keighery
Plants described in 1983
Endemic flora of Southwest Australia